Itki is a town in the Tadjoura Region in northwestern Djibouti. The surrounding district is rich in both livestock and fledgeling agriculture. Itki has one of the mildest climates in Djibouti.

Demographics
The majority of the population of Itki is Afars.

Climate
The prevailing climate in Itki is known as a local steppe climate. The warmest month of the year is June with an average temperature of 30.5 °C. In January, the average temperature is 19.1 °C. Itki is situated on top of Goda Mountains, in a mountainous and hilly area, and represents a key focal point for wildlife. The town's unusual fertility and greenery in the largely arid countryside has attracted many fauna, such as gazelles, birds and camels.

References

Populated places in Djibouti
Tadjourah Region